The 1954 West Texas State Buffaloes football team represented West Texas State College (now known as West Texas A&M University) as a member of the Border Conference during the 1954 college football season. Led by eighth-year head coach Frank Kimbrough, the Buffaloes compiled an overall record of 1–8 with a mark of 1–5 in conference play, placing sixth the Border Conference.

Schedule

References

West Texas State
West Texas A&M Buffaloes football seasons
West Texas State Buffaloes football